The 2011–12 East of Scotland Football League was the 83rd season of the East of Scotland Football League. The Spartans were the defending champions.

The league was split into two separate divisions, the Premier Division and the First Division, with 25 teams competing across the two divisions.

Premier Division

Stirling University claimed their first league title thanks to a superior goal difference after finishing level on points with defending champions Spartans. As champions they entered the second round of the 2012–13 Scottish Cup.

Teams

The following teams changed division prior to the 2011–12 season.

To Premier Division
Promoted from First Division
 Gretna 2008
 Leith Athletic

From Premier Division
Relegated to First Division
 Preston Athletic
 Heriot-Watt University

Stadia and locations

League table

First Division

The First Division saw an increase in the number of clubs to thirteen with the addition of Duns to the league. Heriot-Watt University claimed their second First Division title to gain immediate promotion back to the Premier Division.

Teams

The following teams have changed division since the 2011–12 season.

To First Division
Relegated from Premier Division
 Preston Athletic
 Heriot-Watt University

Transferred from Border Amateur League
 Duns

From First Division
Promoted to Premier Division
 Gretna 2008
 Leith Athletic

Stadia and locations

League table

References

5
East of Scotland Football League